Scotognapha is a genus of European ground spiders that was first described by R. de Dalmas in 1920.

Species
 it contains fourteen species, all from the Canary Islands and the Savage Islands:
Scotognapha arcuata Wunderlich, 2011 – Canary Is.
Scotognapha atomaria Dalmas, 1920 – Canary Is.
Scotognapha brunnea Schmidt, 1980 – Canary Is.
Scotognapha canaricola (Strand, 1911) – Canary Is.
Scotognapha convexa (Simon, 1883) (type) – Canary Is.
Scotognapha costacalma Platnick, Ovtsharenko & Murphy, 2001 – Canary Is.
Scotognapha galletas Platnick, Ovtsharenko & Murphy, 2001 – Canary Is.
Scotognapha haria Platnick, Ovtsharenko & Murphy, 2001 – Canary Is.
Scotognapha juangrandica Platnick, Ovtsharenko & Murphy, 2001 – Canary Is.
Scotognapha medano Platnick, Ovtsharenko & Murphy, 2001 – Canary Is.
Scotognapha paivani (Blackwall, 1864) – Selvagens Is.
Scotognapha taganana Platnick, Ovtsharenko & Murphy, 2001 – Canary Is.
Scotognapha teideensis (Wunderlich, 1992) – Canary Is.
Scotognapha wunderlichi Platnick, Ovtsharenko & Murphy, 2001 – Canary Is.

References

Araneomorphae genera
Gnaphosidae
Spiders of the Canary Islands